The End is an Irish adult comedy late night television strand on Network Two/RTÉ Two in the Republic of Ireland. It was first broadcast September 1993, and last aired in May 1996.

The End was aired on Friday and Saturday night from 11pm to 2am. RTÉ used this show to test the audience appetite for late night TV. The End was presented by Barry Murphy on Friday nights and by Sean Moncrieff on Saturday nights. The End had a cult following of "drunks and teenagers" who would often ring into the show leaving bizarre late night messages for the presenters. Sean Moncrieff would be joined by a puppet called Septic in later seasons.

Barry Murphy would use The End to launch many of his Apres Match characters such as Frank Stapleton.

Sean Moncrieff would get a new chat show on RTÉ One called Good Grief Moncrieff, however this was not a success due in part to the conservative and mainstream RTÉ One audience. Later he would go on to present the RTÉ Two series Don't Feed the Gondolas.

Format
Barry Murphy presented Friday Nights with a mix of his surreal comedy and introductions to the classic BBC comedy series The Fall and Rise of Reginald Perrin and the US sitcom 3rd Rock from the Sun.

Sean Moncrieff presented Saturday Nights with a mix of interviews and introductions to classic BBC comedy series Fawlty Towers and Yes, Minister.

Colin Murnane who had moved on from RTÉ young people's JMTV and Plastic Orange, appeared on both nights as a reporter.

History
The End would help to launch the careers of its two presenters, Sean Moncrieff now hosts his own daytime radio show on Newstalk, while Barry Murphy continues to be a very successful Irish comedian, while also starring in and writing Apres Match for RTÉ Sport.

The End's reporter Colin Murnane had appeared first on RTÉ's youth show JMTV moved to London to present for TCC, BBC, Sky1 and others, and to forge a career as one of the most successful Irish voice-overs in Soho.

It would also begin RTÉ's 24-hour services, up to this point both RTÉ One and Two aired until about midnight each night. The Network Two Night Shift strand would ultimately take over from The End. Night Shift would use the catchphrase "2 until 2" noting that Network Two would be on the air until 2am. Each night would have a specific theme, Sci-Fi on Mondays with shows like Stargate: SG1, Crime on Tuesdays with shows like Millennium and Profiler etc.

External links
 http://www.poolbeg.com/authors/moncrieff_sean.htm
 http://www.londonspeakerbureau.ie/barry_murphy.aspx

1993 Irish television series debuts
1996 Irish television series endings
Irish comedy television shows
RTÉ original programming